Translational Vision Science & Technology is a peer-reviewed online-only open access medical journal covering ophthalmology. It was established in 2012 and is published by the Association for Research in Vision and Ophthalmology, of which it is an official journal. The editor-in-chief is Roy S. Chuck. According to the Journal Citation Reports, the journal has a 2018 impact factor of 2.399, ranking it 19th out of 58 journals in the category "Ophthalmology".

References

External links

Ophthalmology journals
Publications established in 2012
English-language journals
Online-only journals
Open access journals
Academic journals published by learned and professional societies of the United States